Particle filters, or sequential Monte Carlo methods, are a set of Monte Carlo algorithms used to solve filtering problems arising in signal processing and Bayesian statistical inference. The filtering problem consists of estimating the internal states in dynamical systems when partial observations are made and random perturbations are present in the sensors as well as in the dynamical system. The objective is to compute the posterior distributions of the states of a Markov process, given the noisy and partial observations. The term "particle filters" was first coined in 1996 by Pierre Del Moral about mean-field interacting particle methods used in fluid mechanics since the beginning of the 1960s. The term "Sequential Monte Carlo" was coined by Jun S. Liu and Rong Chen in 1998.

Particle filtering uses a set of particles (also called samples) to represent the posterior distribution of a stochastic process given the noisy and/or partial observations. The state-space model can be nonlinear and the initial state and noise distributions can take any form required. Particle filter techniques provide a well-established methodology for generating samples from the required distribution without requiring assumptions about the state-space model or the state distributions. However, these methods do not perform well when applied to very high-dimensional systems.

Particle filters update their prediction in an approximate (statistical) manner. The samples from the distribution are represented by a set of particles; each particle has a likelihood weight assigned to it that represents the probability of that particle being sampled from the probability density function. Weight disparity leading to weight collapse is a common issue encountered in these filtering algorithms. However, it can be mitigated by including a resampling step before the weights become uneven. Several adaptive resampling criteria can be used including the variance of the weights and the relative entropy concerning the uniform distribution. In the resampling step, the particles with negligible weights are replaced by new particles in the proximity of the particles with higher weights.

From the statistical and probabilistic point of view, particle filters may be interpreted as mean-field particle interpretations of Feynman-Kac probability measures. These particle integration techniques were developed in molecular chemistry and computational physics by Theodore E. Harris and Herman Kahn in 1951, Marshall N. Rosenbluth and Arianna W. Rosenbluth in 1955, and more recently by Jack H. Hetherington in 1984. In computational physics, these Feynman-Kac type path particle integration methods are also used in Quantum Monte Carlo, and more specifically Diffusion Monte Carlo methods. Feynman-Kac interacting particle methods are also strongly related to mutation-selection genetic algorithms currently used in evolutionary computation to solve complex optimization problems.

The particle filter methodology is used to solve Hidden Markov Model (HMM) and nonlinear filtering problems. With the notable exception of linear-Gaussian signal-observation models (Kalman filter) or wider classes of models (Benes filter), Mireille Chaleyat-Maurel and Dominique Michel proved in 1984 that the sequence of posterior distributions of the random states of a signal, given the observations (a.k.a. optimal filter), has no finite recursion. Various other numerical methods based on fixed grid approximations, Markov Chain Monte Carlo techniques, conventional linearization, extended Kalman filters, or determining the best linear system (in the expected cost-error sense) are unable to cope with large-scale systems, unstable processes, or insufficiently smooth nonlinearities.

Particle filters and Feynman-Kac particle methodologies find application in signal and image processing, Bayesian inference, machine learning, risk analysis and rare event sampling, engineering and robotics, artificial intelligence, bioinformatics, phylogenetics, computational science, economics and mathematical finance, molecular chemistry, computational physics, pharmacokinetics, and other fields.

History

Heuristic-like algorithms 
From a statistical and probabilistic viewpoint, particle filters belong to the class of branching/genetic type algorithms, and mean-field type interacting particle methodologies. The interpretation of these particle methods depends on the scientific discipline. In Evolutionary Computing, mean-field genetic type particle methodologies are often used as heuristic and natural search algorithms (a.k.a. Metaheuristic). In computational physics and molecular chemistry, they are used to solve Feynman-Kac path integration problems or to compute Boltzmann-Gibbs measures, top eigenvalues, and ground states of Schrödinger operators. In Biology and Genetics, they represent the evolution of a population of individuals or genes in some environment.

The origins of mean-field type evolutionary computational techniques can be traced back to 1950 and 1954 with Alan Turing's work on genetic type mutation-selection learning machines and the articles by Nils Aall Barricelli at the Institute for Advanced Study in Princeton, New Jersey. The first trace of particle filters in statistical methodology dates back to the mid-1950s; the 'Poor Man's Monte Carlo', that was proposed by Hammersley et al., in 1954, contained hints of the genetic type particle filtering methods used today. In 1963, Nils Aall Barricelli simulated a genetic type algorithm to mimic the ability of individuals to play a simple game. In evolutionary computing literature, genetic-type mutation-selection algorithms became popular through the seminal work of John Holland in the early 1970s, particularly his book published in 1975.

In Biology and Genetics, the Australian geneticist Alex Fraser also published in 1957 a series of papers on the genetic type simulation of artificial selection of organisms. The computer simulation of the evolution by biologists became more common in the early 1960s, and the methods were described in books by Fraser and Burnell (1970) and Crosby (1973). Fraser's simulations included all of the essential elements of modern mutation-selection genetic particle algorithms.

From the mathematical viewpoint, the conditional distribution of the random states of a signal given some partial and noisy observations is described by a Feynman-Kac probability on the random trajectories of the signal weighted by a sequence of likelihood potential functions. Quantum Monte Carlo, and more specifically Diffusion Monte Carlo methods can also be interpreted as a mean-field genetic type particle approximation of Feynman-Kac path integrals. The origins of Quantum Monte Carlo methods are often attributed to Enrico Fermi and Robert Richtmyer who developed in 1948 a mean-field particle interpretation of neutron-chain reactions, but the first heuristic-like and genetic type particle algorithm (a.k.a. Resampled or Reconfiguration Monte Carlo methods) for estimating ground state energies of quantum systems (in reduced matrix models) is due to Jack H. Hetherington in 1984. One can also quote the earlier seminal works of Theodore E. Harris and Herman Kahn in particle physics, published in 1951, using mean-field but heuristic-like genetic methods for estimating particle transmission energies. In molecular chemistry, the use of genetic heuristic-like particle methodologies (a.k.a. pruning and enrichment strategies) can be traced back to 1955 with the seminal work of Marshall. N. Rosenbluth and Arianna. W. Rosenbluth.

The use of genetic particle algorithms in advanced signal processing and Bayesian inference is more recent. In January 1993, Genshiro Kitagawa developed a "Monte Carlo filter", a slightly modified version of this article appeared in 1996. In April 1993, Gordon et al., published in their seminal work an application of genetic type algorithm in Bayesian statistical inference. The authors named their algorithm 'the bootstrap filter', and demonstrated that compared to other filtering methods, their bootstrap algorithm does not require any assumption about that state space or the noise of the system. Independently, the ones by Pierre Del Moral and Himilcon Carvalho, Pierre Del Moral, André Monin, and Gérard Salut on particle filters published in the mid-1990s. Particle filters were also developed in signal processing in early 1989-1992 by P. Del Moral, J.C. Noyer, G. Rigal, and G. Salut in the LAAS-CNRS in a series of restricted and classified research reports with STCAN (Service Technique des Constructions et Armes Navales), the IT company DIGILOG, and the LAAS-CNRS (the Laboratory for Analysis and Architecture of Systems) on RADAR/SONAR and GPS signal processing problems.

Mathematical foundations 
From 1950 to 1996, all the publications on particle filters, and genetic algorithms, including the pruning and resample Monte Carlo methods introduced in computational physics and molecular chemistry, present natural and heuristic-like algorithms applied to different situations without a single proof of their consistency, nor a discussion on the bias of the estimates and genealogical and ancestral tree-based algorithms.

The mathematical foundations and the first rigorous analysis of these particle algorithms are due to Pierre Del Moral in 1996. The article also contains proof of the unbiased properties of a particle approximation of likelihood functions and unnormalized conditional probability measures. The unbiased particle estimator of the likelihood functions presented in this article is used today in Bayesian statistical inference.

Branching-type particle methodologies with varying population sizes were also developed toward the end of the 1990s by Dan Crisan, Jessica Gaines, and Terry Lyons, and by Dan Crisan, Pierre Del Moral, and Terry Lyons. Further developments in this field were made in 2000 by P. Del Moral, A. Guionnet and L. Miclo. The first central limit theorems are due to Pierre Del Moral and Alice Guionnet in 1999 and Pierre Del Moral and Laurent Miclo in 2000. The first uniform convergence results concerning the time parameter for particle filters were developed at the end of the 1990s by Pierre Del Moral and Alice Guionnet. The first rigorous analysis of genealogical tree-ased particle filter smoothers is due to P. Del Moral and L. Miclo in 2001

The theory on Feynman-Kac particle methodologies and related particle filter algorithms was developed in 2000 and 2004 in the books. These abstract probabilistic models encapsulate genetic type algorithms, particle, and bootstrap filters, interacting Kalman filters (a.k.a. Rao–Blackwellized particle filter), importance sampling and resampling style particle filter techniques, including genealogical tree-based and particle backward methodologies for solving filtering and smoothing problems. Other classes of particle filtering methodologies include genealogical tree-based models, backward Markov particle models, adaptive mean-field particle models, island-type particle models, and particle Markov chain Monte Carlo methodologies.

The filtering problem

Objective 
The objective of a particle filter is to estimate the posterior density of the state variables given the observation variables. The particle filter is designed for a hidden Markov Model, where the system consists of both hidden and observable variables. The observable variables (observation process) are related to the hidden variables (state-process) by some functional form that is known. Similarly, the dynamical system describing the evolution of the state variables is also known probabilistically.

A generic particle filter estimates the posterior distribution of the hidden states using the observation measurement process. With respect to a state-space such as the one below:

 
the filtering problem is to estimate sequentially the values of the hidden states , given the values of the observation process  at any time step k.

All Bayesian estimates of  follow from the posterior density . The particle filter methodology provides an approximation of these conditional probabilities using the empirical measure associated with a genetic type particle algorithm. In contrast, the Markov Chain Monte Carlo or importance sampling approach would model the full posterior .

The Signal-Observation model 
Particle methods often assume  and the observations  can be modeled in this form:

This model is also often written in a synthetic way as 

with an initial probability density .
In addition, we assume conditional distribution for  given  are absolutely continuous, and in a synthetic way we have

An example of system with these properties is:

These two equations can be viewed as state space equations and look similar to the state space equations for the Kalman filter. If not, Kalman filter-based methods are a first-order approximation (EKF) or a second-order approximation (UKF in general, but if the probability distribution is Gaussian a third-order approximation is possible).

The assumption that the initial distribution and the transitions of the Markov chain are continuous for the Lebesgue measure can be relaxed. To design a particle filter we simply need to assume that we can sample the transitions  of the Markov chain  and to compute the likelihood function  (see for instance the genetic selection mutation description of the particle filter given below).

Approximate Bayesian computation models 

In certain problems, the conditional distribution of observations, given the random states of the signal, may fail to have a density; the latter may be impossible or too complex to compute. In this situation, an additional level of approximation is necessitated. One strategy is to replace the signal  by the Markov chain  and to introduce a virtual observation of the form

for some sequence of independent random variables  with known probability density functions. The central idea is to observe that

These probabilistic techniques are closely related to Approximate Bayesian Computation (ABC). In the context of particle filters, these ABC particle filtering techniques were introduced in 1998 by P. Del Moral, J. Jacod and P. Protter. They were further developed by P. Del Moral, A. Doucet and A. Jasra.

The nonlinear filtering equation 
Bayes' rule for conditional probability gives:

where

Particle filters are also an approximation, but with enough particles they can be much more accurate. The nonlinear filtering equation is given by the recursion

with the convention  for k = 0. The nonlinear filtering problem consists in computing these conditional distributions sequentially.

Feynman-Kac formulation 

We fix a time horizon n and a sequence of observations , and for each k = 0, ..., n we set:

Feynman-Kac path integration models arise in a variety of scientific disciplines, including in computational physics, biology, information theory and computer sciences. Their interpretations are dependent on the application domain. For instance, if we choose the indicator function  of some subset of the state space, they represent the conditional distribution of a Markov chain given it stays in a given tube; that is, we have:

and

as soon as the normalizing constant is strictly positive.

Particle filters

A Genetic type particle algorithm 
Initially, such an algorithm starts with N independent random variables  with common probability density . The genetic algorithm selection-mutation transitions

mimic/approximate the updating-prediction transitions of the optimal filter evolution:

 During the selection-updating transition we sample N (conditionally) independent random variables  with common (conditional) distribution

where  stands for the Dirac measure at a given state a.

 During the mutation-prediction transition, from each selected particle  we sample independently a transition 

At each time k, we have the particle approximations

and

In Genetic algorithms and Evolutionary computing community, the mutation-selection Markov chain described above is often called the genetic algorithm with proportional selection. Several branching variants, including with random population sizes have also been proposed in the articles.

Monte Carlo principles 
Particle methods, like all sampling-based approaches (e.g., Markov Chain Monte Carlo), generate a set of samples that approximate the filtering density

Then, expectations with respect to the filtering distribution are approximated by

with

where  stands for the Dirac measure at a given state a. The function f, in the usual way for Monte Carlo, can give all the moments etc. of the distribution up to some approximation error. When the approximation equation  is satisfied for any bounded function f we write

Particle filters can be interpreted as a genetic type particle algorithm evolving with mutation and selection transitions. We can keep track of the ancestral lines

of the particles . The random states , with the lower indices l=0,...,k, stands for the ancestor of the individual  at level l=0,...,k. In this situation, we have the approximation formula

with the empirical measure

Here F stands for any founded function on the path space of the signal. In a more synthetic form is equivalent to

Particle filters can be interpreted in many different ways. From the probabilistic point of view they coincide with a mean-field particle interpretation of the nonlinear filtering equation. The updating-prediction transitions of the optimal filter evolution can also be interpreted as the classical genetic type selection-mutation transitions of individuals. The sequential importance resampling technique provides another interpretation of the filtering transitions coupling importance sampling with the bootstrap resampling step. Last, but not least, particle filters can be seen as an acceptance-rejection methodology equipped with a recycling mechanism.

Mean-field particle simulation

The general probabilistic principle 
The nonlinear filtering evolution can be interpreted as a dynamical system in the set of probability measures of the form  where  stands for some mapping from the set of probability distribution into itself. For instance, the evolution of the one-step optimal predictor 

satisfies a nonlinear evolution starting with the probability distribution . One of the simplest ways to approximate these probability measures is to start with N independent random variables  with common probability distribution   . Suppose we have defined a sequence of N random variables  such that

At the next step we sample N (conditionally) independent random variables  with common law .

A particle interpretation of the filtering equation 
We illustrate this mean-field particle principle in the context of the evolution of the one step optimal predictors

For k = 0 we use the convention .

By the law of large numbers, we have

in the sense that

for any bounded function . We further assume that we have constructed a sequence of particles  at some rank k such that

in the sense that for any bounded function  we have

In this situation, replacing  by the empirical measure  in the evolution equation of the one-step optimal filter stated in  we find that

Notice that the right hand side in the above formula is a weighted probability mixture

Then, we sample N independent random variable  with common probability density   so that

Iterating this procedure, we design a Markov chain such that

Notice that the optimal filter is approximated at each time step k using the Bayes' formulae

The terminology "mean-field approximation" comes from the fact that we replace at each time step the probability measure  by the empirical approximation . The mean-field particle approximation of the filtering problem is far from being unique. Several strategies are developed in the books.

Some convergence results 
The analysis of the convergence of particle filters was started in 1996 and in 2000 in the book and the series of articles. More recent developments can be found in the books, When the filtering equation is stable (in the sense that it corrects any erroneous initial condition), the bias and the variance of the particle particle estimates

are controlled by the non asymptotic uniform estimates

for any function f bounded by 1, and for some finite constants   In addition, for any :

for some finite constants  related to the asymptotic bias and variance of the particle estimate, and some finite constant c. The same results are satisfied if we replace the one step optimal predictor by the optimal filter approximation.

Genealogical trees and Unbiasedness properties

Genealogical tree based particle smoothing 
Tracing back in time the ancestral lines

These empirical approximations are equivalent to the particle integral approximations

for any bounded function F on the random trajectories of the signal. As shown in the evolution of the genealogical tree coincides with a mean-field particle interpretation of the evolution equations associated with the posterior densities of the signal trajectories. For more details on these path space models, we refer to the books.

Unbiased particle estimates of likelihood functions 
We use the product formula

with

Replacing  by the empirical approximation

in the above displayed formula, we design the following unbiased particle approximation of the likelihood function

with

The design of this particle estimate and the unbiasedness property has been proved in 1996 in the article. Refined variance estimates can be found in and.

Backward particle smoothers 
Using Bayes' rule, we have the formula

Notice that

This implies that

Replacing the one-step optimal predictors  by the particle empirical measures

we find that

We conclude that

with the backward particle approximation

The probability measure

is the probability of the random paths of a Markov chain running backward in time from time k=n to time k=0, and evolving at each time step k in the state space associated with the population of particles 
 Initially (at time k=n) the chain  chooses randomly a state with the distribution

For instance, for any function  we have the particle estimates

where

This also shows that if

then

Some convergence results 
We shall assume that filtering equation is stable, in the sense that it corrects any erroneous initial condition.

In this situation, the particle approximations of the likelihood functions are unbiased and the relative variance is controlled by

for some finite constant c. In addition, for any :

for some finite constants  related to the asymptotic bias and variance of the particle estimate, and for some finite constant c.

The bias and the variance of  the particle particle estimates based on the ancestral lines of the genealogical trees

are controlled by the non asymptotic uniform estimates

for any function F bounded by 1, and for some finite constants  In addition, for any :

for some finite constants  related to the asymptotic bias and variance of the particle estimate, and for some finite constant c. The same type of bias and variance estimates hold for the backward particle smoothers. For additive functionals of the form

with

with functions  bounded by 1, we have

and

for some finite constants  More refined estimates including exponentially small probability of errors are developed in.

Sequential Importance Resampling (SIR)

Monte Carlo filter and bootstrap filter 
Sequential importance Resampling (SIR), Monte Carlo filtering (Kitagawa 1993) and the bootstrap filtering algorithm (Gordon et al. 1993), are also commonly applied filtering algorithms, which approximate the filtering probability density  by a weighted set of N samples

 

The importance weights  are approximations to the relative posterior probabilities (or densities) of the samples such that

Sequential importance sampling (SIS) is a sequential (i.e., recursive) version of importance sampling. As in importance sampling, the expectation of a function f can be approximated as a weighted average

 

For a finite set of samples, the algorithm performance is dependent on the choice of the proposal distribution

 .

The "optimal" proposal distribution is given as the target distribution
 

This particular choice of proposal transition has been proposed by P. Del Moral in 1996 and 1998. When it is difficult to sample transitions according to the distribution   one natural strategy is to use the following particle approximation

with the empirical approximation

associated with N (or any other large number of samples) independent random samples with the conditional distribution of the random state  given . The consistency of the resulting particle filter of this approximation and other extensions are developed in. In the above display  stands for the Dirac measure at a given state a.

However, the transition prior probability distribution is often used as importance function, since it is easier to draw particles (or samples) and perform subsequent importance weight calculations:
 
Sequential Importance Resampling (SIR) filters with transition prior probability distribution as importance function are commonly known as bootstrap filter and condensation algorithm.

Resampling is used to avoid the problem of degeneracy of the algorithm, that is, avoiding the situation that all but one of the importance weights are close to zero. The performance of the algorithm can be also affected by proper choice of resampling method. The stratified sampling proposed by Kitagawa (1993) is optimal in terms of variance.

A single step of sequential importance resampling is as follows:

1) For  draw samples from the proposal distribution
 

2) For  update the importance weights up to a normalizing constant:

 Note that when we use the transition prior probability distribution as the importance function, 

this simplifies to the following :

3) For  compute the normalized importance weights:
 

4) Compute an estimate of the effective number of particles as
 
This criterion reflects the variance of the weights. Other criteria can be found in the article, including their rigorous analysis and central limit theorems.

5) If the effective number of particles is less than a given threshold , then perform resampling:
a) Draw N particles from the current particle set with probabilities proportional to their weights. Replace the current particle set with this new one.
b) For  set 

The term "Sampling Importance Resampling" is also sometimes used when referring to SIR filters, but the term Importance Resampling is more accurate because the word "resampling" implies that the initial sampling has already been done.

Sequential importance sampling (SIS) 
 Is the same as sequential importance resampling, but without the resampling stage.

"Direct version" algorithm 

The "direct version" algorithm  is rather simple (compared to other particle filtering algorithms) and it uses composition and rejection. To generate a single sample x at k from :
Set n = 0 (This will count the number of particles generated so far)
Uniformly choose an index i from the range 
Generate a test  from the distribution  with 
Generate the probability of  using  from  where  is the measured value
Generate another uniform u from  where 

1) Set n = 0 (This will count the number of particles generated so far)

2) Uniformly choose an index i from the range 

3) Generate a test  from the distribution  with 

4) Generate the probability of  using  from  where  is the measured value

5) Generate another uniform u from  where 

6) Compare u and 

6a) If u is larger then repeat from step 2

7) If n == N then quit

This requires that a Markov equation can be written (and computed) to generate a  based only upon .

This can be more easily visualized if x is viewed as a two-dimensional array. One dimension is k and the other dimension is the particle number. Step 3 generates a potential  based on a randomly chosen particle at time  and rejects or accepts it in step 6. In other words, the  values are generated using the previously generated .

Applications 
Particle filters and Feynman-Kac particle methodologies find application in several contexts, as an effective mean for tackling noisy observations or strong nonlinearities, such as:
Bayesian inference, machine learning, risk analysis and rare event sampling
Bioinformatics
Computational science
Economics, financial mathematics and mathematical finance: particle filters can perform simulations which are needed to compute the high-dimensional and/or complex integrals related to problems such as dynamic stochastic general equilibrium models in macro-economics and option pricing
Engineering
Fault detection and isolation: in observer-based schemas a particle filter can forecast expected sensors output enabling fault isolation
Molecular chemistry and computational physics
Pharmacokinetics
Phylogenetics
Robotics, artificial intelligence: Monte Carlo localization is a de facto standard in mobile robot localization
Signal and image processing: visual localization, tracking, feature recognition

Other particle filters 
 Auxiliary particle filter
 Cost Reference particle filter
 Exponential Natural Particle Filter
 Feynman-Kac and mean-field particle methodologies
 Gaussian particle filter
 Gauss–Hermite particle filter
 Hierarchical/Scalable particle filter
 Nudged particle filter
 Particle Markov-Chain Monte-Carlo, see e.g. pseudo-marginal Metropolis–Hastings algorithm.
 Rao–Blackwellized particle filter
 Regularized auxiliary particle filter
 Rejection-sampling based optimal particle filter
 Unscented particle filter

See also 
 Ensemble Kalman filter
 Generalized filtering
 Genetic algorithm
 Mean-field particle methods
 Monte Carlo localization
 Moving horizon estimation
 Recursive Bayesian estimation

References

Bibliography 
 
 Del Moral, Pierre (2004). Feynman-Kac formulae. Genealogical and interacting particle approximations. Springer. p. 575. "Series: Probability and Applications"
 Del Moral, Pierre (2013). Mean field simulation for Monte Carlo integration. Chapman & Hall/CRC Press. p. 626. "Monographs on Statistics & Applied Probability"

External links

 Feynman–Kac models and interacting particle algorithms (a.k.a. Particle Filtering) Theoretical aspects and a list of application domains of particle filters
 Sequential Monte Carlo Methods (Particle Filtering) homepage on University of Cambridge
 Dieter Fox's MCL Animations
 Rob Hess' free software
 SMCTC: A Template Class for Implementing SMC algorithms in C++
 Java applet on particle filtering
 vSMC : Vectorized Sequential Monte Carlo
 Particle filter explained in the context of self driving car

Monte Carlo methods
Computational statistics

Nonlinear filters
Robot control
Statistical mechanics
Sampling techniques
Stochastic simulation